Wilhelmina Popper (11 May 1857 – 11 June 1944) was a Hungarian Jewish short story and children's writer.

Popper was born in Raab, Hungary to Josefine and Dr. Armin Popper. She was educated in her native town, and began to write at an early age. Besides contributing essays to various German and Hungarian periodicals, she published numerous volumes of stories and sketches.

She was murdered at the Auschwitz concentration camp in 1944.

Bibliography

References
 

1857 births
1944 deaths
19th-century short story writers
20th-century short story writers
19th-century Hungarian women writers
20th-century Hungarian women writers
Hungarian children's writers
Hungarian Jews who died in the Holocaust
Hungarian people who died in Auschwitz concentration camp
Hungarian short story writers
Hungarian writers in German
Jewish women writers
Hungarian women children's writers
Women short story writers
People from Győr
Hungarian civilians killed in World War II